Solanum grandiflorum is an evergreen tree or treelet native to the wet lowland forests of the Amazon Basin; currently reported in Bolivia, Brazil, Colombia, Ecuador and Peru at 150–1600 meters above sea level.

References

grandiflorum
Trees of Peru
Trees of Ecuador
Trees of Brazil
Trees of Bolivia
Trees of Colombia